Birch Hill is a census-designated place in the town of Sanborn, Ashland County, Wisconsin, United States. Its population was 293 as of the 2010 census.

References

Bad River Band of the Lake Superior Tribe of Chippewa Indians
Census-designated places in Ashland County, Wisconsin
Census-designated places in Wisconsin